Magdana's Donkey is a 1955 Georgian black-and-white social-themed drama film co-directed by Revaz Chkheidze and Tengiz Abuladze based on a short story of the same name by Ekaterine Gabashvili.

Plot
In a small Georgian village at the beginning of the 20th century(? 1895), a widow (Magdana) and her three children (Sopo, Mikho, and Kato) live in poverty, making ends meet by selling yoghurt in the city. The children find a sick abandoned donkey and bring it back to health and then the family's luck begins to change for the better. Then the donkeys old owner (Mitua) sees the donkey in the city and wants it back.

Production
This film was the debut feature of Tengiz Abuladze and Revaz Chkheidze. Magdana's Donkey was acclaimed as the start of a “new wave” in Soviet cinema.

The leading role (Magdana) was played by Georgian actress Dudukhana Tserodze. The film won the Best Fiction Short award at the 1956 Cannes Film Festival.

Cast
Dudukhana Tserodze as Magdana
L. Moistsrapishvili as Sopo (Magdana's older daughter)
Mikho Borashvili as Mikho (Magdana's boy)
Nani Chikvinidze as Kato (Magdana's younger daughter)
Akaki Kvantaliani as Mitua
Karlo Sakandelidze as Vano
Akaki Vasadze as Village Foreman/Landlord
Aleksandre Omiadze as Gigo (Magdana's Father)
Aleksandre Takaishvili as Judge

Prizes and awards 
 Prix du film de fiction - court métrage - 1956 Cannes Film Festival
 Special prize in Edinburgh International Film Festival (1956)

References

External links
 

Georgian-language films
1956 drama films
1956 films
Soviet black-and-white films
Films directed by Tengiz Abuladze
Films directed by Revaz Chkheidze
Drama films from Georgia (country)
Soviet-era films from Georgia (country)
Soviet drama films